Pexicopia pycnoda is a moth of the family Gelechiidae. It was described by Oswald Bertram Lower in 1899. It is found in Australia, where it has been recorded from New South Wales.

The forewings are light greyish ochreous, bronzy tinged, irrorated (sprinkled) with fuscous and dark fuscous. This irroration appears to indicate faint darker fasciae at the base, one-third, two-thirds, and the apex. The discal stigmata are obscurely indicated. The hindwings are whitish grey.

References

Moths described in 1899
Pexicopia